A Kégresse track is a kind of rubber or canvas continuous track which uses a flexible belt rather than interlocking metal segments. It can be fitted to a conventional car or truck to turn it into a half-track, suitable for use over rough or soft ground. Conventional front wheels and steering are used, although skis may also be fitted. A snowmobile is a smaller ski-only type.

Technology
The Kégresse propulsion and suspension system incorporates an articulated bogie, fitted to the rear of the vehicle with a large drive wheel at one end, a large unpowered idler wheel at the other, and several small guide wheels in between, over which run a reinforced flexible belt. The belt is fitted with metal or rubber treads to grip the ground. It differs from conventional track systems by using a flexible belt rather than interlocking metal segments.

Use in Russia
The name comes from the system's inventor Adolphe Kégresse, who designed the original while working for Tsar Nicholas II of Russia between 1906 and 1916. He applied it to several cars in the royal garage including Rolls-Royce cars and Packard trucks. The Russian army also fitted the system to a number of their Austin Armoured Cars.

Further development in France
After the Russian Revolution Adolphe Kégresse returned to his native country, France, where the system was used on Citroën cars between 1921 and 1937 for off-road and military vehicles. A series of expeditions across the undeveloped parts of Asia, America, and Africa was undertaken by Citroën, demonstrating the all-terrain capabilities of these vehicles. In World War II, both sides used this system in the war effort. In the 1920s, the U.S. Army purchased several Citroën-Kégresse vehicles for evaluation and then purchased a licence to produce them. This resulted in the Army Ordnance Department building a prototype in 1939. In December 1942, it went into production with the M2 Half Track Car and M3 Half-track versions. The Nazis also captured many of these Citroën half-track vehicles and armored them for their own use.

Use in Great Britain
An 30 cwt armored personnel carrier called "Burford-Kégress" was built by the British firm Burford on the basis of its four-axle trucks with wheel formula 4 × 2. It was equipped with rear-axle powered Kégresse tracks produced under license from the French company Citroën. Finished in 1926, the prototype passed trials, the results of which were positively received by the military and in the same year the British Army commissioned Burford to build a small batch. Despite the success of the test, as a result of continuous operation it was discovered that the Kégresse had an extremely low wear resistance and often broke down. As a result, in 1929, only three years after its creation, the machines were taken out of service and later scrapped.

Use in Poland
Citroën-Kégresse vehicles served in the Polish motorized artillery during the 1930s.

In addition the Polish produced their own Kégresse track trucks called the "Półgąsienicowy 34" (literally "Half-Track car, 1934") or better known as C4P was a Polish half-track derived from the 4.5-ton Polski Fiat 621 truck, produced under license since 1932. This vehicle was designed by the BiRZ Badań Technicznych Broni Pancernych - Warsaw Armored Weapons and Technical Research Bureau (BBT BP) in 1934. For the construction several parts of the Fiat 621 truck were used, some were modified or upgraded. The short reinforced chassis was retained, and the engine and the cab received some modifications. The front axle was reinforced to integrate the 4x4 transmission. The rear axle was replaced with a small track, as on the Citroën Kégresse P14 / P17 / P19 and the Vickers E. The tests and adjustments were carried out in 1935, and production began in 1936 in the factory of the state company Państwowe Zakłady Inżynierii (PZinz) in Warsaw. During the production, the model received other modifications made by the manufacturer and engineering office PZInz. Between 1936 and the beginning of the war, more than 400 vehicles were produced in different versions. The exact number is unknown. At least 80 C4P artillery tractors have been accounted for.

Use in Belgium
The FN-Kégresse 3T was a half-track vehicle used by the Belgian armed forces as an artillery tractor between 1934-1940. 130 FN Kégresse 3T's were built, with some 100 actually in use with the Belgian armed forces on 10 May 1940, the start of the battle of Belgium.

Use in the United States
In the late 1920s the U.S. Army purchased several Citroën-Kégresse vehicles for evaluation followed by a licence to produce them. This resulted in the Army Ordnance Department building a prototype in 1939. In December 1942 it went into production with the M2 and M3 half-track versions. The United States eventually produced more than 41,000 vehicles in over 70 versions between 1940 and 1944.

Gallery

See also
Alfred Becker
AMC Schneider P 16
SOMUA MCG

Sources

External links
Citroën-Kegresse halftracks in the Polish Army
Informationen über Leben und Werk von Adolphe Kégresse (German language)
Register of Kegresse Track vehicles

Automotive suspension technologies
Engineering vehicles